Eopululo is the oldest known genus of New World porcupines (Erethizontidae). It is known only from the possibly late Late Eocene to Early Oligocene (Divisaderan to Deseadan in the SALMA classification) of the Yahuarango Formation at the Santa Rosa local fauna site of Ucayali Department, eastern Peru. There is only one species in the genus, Eopululo wigmorei. It was described in 2004, and it is a member of one of the oldest rodent faunas known from South America.

References 

Erethizontidae
Eocene mammals of South America
Oligocene mammals of South America
Deseadan
Tinguirirican
Divisaderan
Paleogene Peru
Fossils of Peru
Fossil taxa described in 2004